The Borough of Great Yarmouth is a local government district with borough status in Norfolk, England. It is named after its main town, Great Yarmouth.

History
The borough was formed on 1 April 1974, under the Local Government Act 1972, as a merger of the former county borough of Great Yarmouth, along with part of Blofield and Flegg Rural District, and also part of the Lothingland Rural District in East Suffolk.

The amendment to include five parishes from Lothingland RD in Norfolk was made by Anthony Fell, MP for Yarmouth, at committee stage.

In the 2016 Referendum on the issue, 71.5% of Great Yarmouth voted to leave the European Union, the 5th highest such leave vote in the country.

Politics

Elections to the borough council are held in three out of every four years, with one third of the currently 39 seats on the council being elected at each election.

Historic overall control of council by party group
Conservative: 1973 to 1980, 1983 to 1986, 2000 to 2012, 2016 to date
Labour:1990 to 2000, 2012 to 2013
No overall control by one group of councillors in other years

As of the end of April 2018, councillors have these denominations:

UK Youth Parliament

Although the UK Youth Parliament is an apolitical organisation, the elections are run in a way similar to that of the Local Elections. The votes come from 11 to 18-year olds and are combined to make the decision of the next, 2-year Member of Youth Parliament. The elections are run at different times across the country with Great Yarmouth's typically being in early Spring and bi-annually.

The current Member of Youth Parliament for Great Yarmouth is Cameron Hodds MYP.

Composition
The borough comprises the urban area of Great Yarmouth itself, together with 21 surrounding parishes. At the time of the 2001 census, the borough had an area of 182 km², of which 26 km² was in the urban area and 156 km² in the surrounding parishes. The borough had a population of 90,810 in 39,380 households, with 47,288 people in 21,007 households living in the urban area, whilst 43,522 people in 18,373 households lived in the surrounding parishes.

Places
Besides Great Yarmouth itself, other significant settlements in the borough include:

Bastwick, Belton, Bradwell, Browston Green, Burgh Castle, Burgh St Margaret
Caister-on-Sea, California
East Somerton
Filby, Fleggburgh, Fritton
Gorleston-on-Sea
Hemsby, Hopton-on-Sea
Martham, Mautby
Runham
Ormesby St. Margaret, Ormesby St. Michael
Repps, Rollesby
St. Olaves, Scratby, Stokesby
Thrigby
West Somerton, Winterton-on-Sea
Cobholm Island

Parishes
The urban area of Great Yarmouth itself is unparished. The remainder of the district comprises the following civil parishes:

Ashby with Oby
Belton with Browston †, Bradwell †, Burgh Castle †
Caister-on-Sea
Filby, Fleggburgh with Billockby & Clippesby, Fritton and St. Olaves †
Hemsby, Hopton-on-Sea †
Martham, Mautby
Ormesby St. Margaret with Scratby, Ormesby St. Michael
Repps with Bastwick, Rollesby
Somerton, Stokesby with Herringby
Thurne
West Caister, Winterton-on-Sea

† formerly part of Lothingland Rural District

Freedom of the Borough
The following people and military units have received the Freedom of the Borough of Great Yarmouth.

Individuals
 Admiral Rt Hon Lord Nelson : 1800.
 Councillor Cora Batley: 1997.
 Councillor Michael Thomas Jeal: 14 April 2022.

Military Units
 The 1st East Anglian Regiment: 1963.
 The Royal Anglian Regiment: 1964.
 HMS Yarmouth, RN: 1984.
 The Great Yarmouth and Gorleston Lifeboat Station, RNLI: 1984.
 The Caister Volunteer Lifeboat Service: 1984.  

 901 Troop Royal Marines Cadets: 28 September 2012.
 The Royal British Legion (Great Yarmouth Branch): 2 November 2012.
 , RN: 11 June 2013.

See also
Great Yarmouth Outer Harbour

References

 
Non-metropolitan districts of Norfolk
Boroughs in England